The Governor of Northern Rhodesia was the representative of the British Monarch in the self-governing colony of Northern Rhodesia from 1924 to 1964. The Governor was appointed by The Crown and acted as the local head of state, receiving instructions from the British Government.

Establishment of the office
The office of the Governor of Northern Rhodesia was established on 20 February 1924, when the Northern Rhodesia Order in Council, 1924 was adopted. It provided that:

List of governors of Northern Rhodesia

For continuation after independence, see: President of Zambia

See also
President of Zambia
Prime Minister of Zambia
Governor-General of the Federation of Rhodesia and Nyasaland

References

Rhodesia, Northern
 
Governor
Governors
Zambia and the Commonwealth of Nations
1924 establishments in Northern Rhodesia
1964 disestablishments in Zambia